On the Far Side of the Tunnel is a 1994 Spanish drama film directed by Jaime de Armiñán. It was entered into the 44th Berlin International Film Festival.

Cast
 Rafael Alonso as Hermano Benito
 Luis Barbero as Prior
 Amparo Baró as Rosa
 Jorge Calvo as Hermano Felicísimo
 Gabriel Latorre as Hermano Ventura
 Fernando Rey as Miguel
 Susi Sánchez as Marisa
 Gonzalo Vega as Aurelio
 Maribel Verdú as Mariana
 Pedro Álvarez-Ossorio as Hermano Sinesio

References

External links

1994 films
1990s Spanish-language films
1994 drama films
Films directed by Jaime de Armiñán
Spanish drama films
1990s Spanish films